The 2001 Cal Poly Mustangs football team represented California Polytechnic State University during the 2001 NCAA Division I-AA football season.

Cal Poly competed as an NCAA Division I-AA independent in 2001. The Mustangs were led by first-year head coach Rich Ellerson and played home games at Mustang Stadium in San Luis Obispo, California. The Mustangs finished the season with a record of six wins and five losses (6–5). Overall, the team outscored its opponents 292–248 for the season.

Schedule

Team players in the NFL
The following Cal Poly Mustang players were selected in the 2002 NFL Draft.

Notes

References

Cal Poly
Cal Poly Mustangs football seasons
Cal Poly Mustangs football